The São Tomé and Príncipe Council of Ministers consists of thirteen members appointed by the president with the advice of the prime minister.

The Council of Ministers is chaired by the prime minister and is tasked with managing government operations. It is held accountable by the president and the National Assembly.

Members 
Current Council of Ministers since 29 November 2014:

References 

 
Lists of political office-holders in São Tomé and Príncipe
Lists of current office-holders